Çolakoğlu power station (also known as Çolakoğlu-2 or Gebze Çolakoğlu) is a 190-megawatt coal-fired power station in Turkey in Gebze, Kocaeli Province, which burns imported and local coal.

References

External links 

 Gebze Çolakoğlu power station on Global Energy Monitor

Coal-fired power stations in Turkey
Gebze
Buildings and structures in Kocaeli Province